Charles P. "Chuck" Benedict (born 13 August 1946 in Norwalk, Connecticut)  was a Democratic Party member of the Wisconsin State Assembly, representing the 45th Assembly District from 2004 to 2010.

In April 2010, Benedict announced he would not seek reelection.

Education
In 1968, Benedict received his AB from Dartmouth College and in 1970 he received his MA from Princeton University. Nine years later he received his MD in 1979 from the University of Connecticut. Benedict also attended Duke University.

Professional experience
Benedict was also a high school math and science teacher and a neurologist.

Political experience
From 2004-2010 Benedict was an assembly member for Wisconsin State Assembly.

References

External links
Wisconsin Assembly - Representative Chuck Benedict official government website
 
 Follow the Money - Chuck Benedict
2008 2006 2004 campaign contributions
Campaign 2008 campaign contributions at Wisconsin Democracy Campaign

1946 births
Living people
21st-century American politicians
Democratic Party members of the Wisconsin State Assembly